The 2015–16 South Alabama Jaguars basketball team represented the University of South Alabama during the 2015–16 NCAA Division I men's basketball season. The Jaguars, led by third year head coach Matthew Graves, played third home games at the Mitchell Center and were members of the Sun Belt Conference. They finished the season 14–19, 8–12 in Sun Belt play to finish in a tie for seventh place. They defeated Georgia Southern in the first round of the Sun Belt tournament to advance to the quarterfinals where they lost to Louisiana–Lafayette.

Roster

Schedule

|-
!colspan=9 style="background:#000066; color:#ff0000;"| Exhibition

|-
!colspan=9 style="background:#000066; color:#ff0000;"| Regular season

|-
!colspan=9 style="background:#000066; color:#ff0000;"| Sun Belt tournament

References

South Alabama Jaguars men's basketball seasons
South Alabama
2015 in sports in Alabama
2016 in sports in Alabama